Group C of the 2002 FIFA World Cup took place between 3 and 13 June 2002. Brazil won the group, and advanced to the second round, along with Turkey. Costa Rica was level with Turkey on points, but had a worse goal difference. China finished bottom of the group, having lost all three of their matches.

Standings

Brazil advanced to play Belgium (runner-up of Group H) in the round of 16.
Turkey advanced to play Japan (winner of Group H) in the round of 16.

Matches
All times are local (UTC+9)

Brazil vs Turkey

China vs Costa Rica

Brazil vs China

Costa Rica vs Turkey

Costa Rica vs Brazil

Turkey vs China

External links
 Results

C
Group
Group
Group
Group